Qaraqiyeh or Qara Qayeh may refer to:
 Qara Qayeh, Hamadan
 Qara Qayeh, Zanjan